Spelt (Triticum spelta), also known as dinkel wheat or hulled wheat, is a species of wheat that has been cultivated since approximately 5000 BC.

Spelt was an important staple food in parts of Europe from the Bronze Age to medieval times. Now it survives as a relict crop in Central Europe and northern Spain, and it has found a new market as a health food. Spelt is sometimes considered a subspecies of the closely related species common wheat (Triticum aestivum), in which case its botanical name is considered to be Triticum aestivum subsp. spelta. Like common wheat, it is a hexaploid wheat, which means it has six sets of chromosomes.

Evolution
Spelt has a complex history. It is a wheat species known from genetic evidence to have originated as a naturally occurring hybrid of a domesticated tetraploid wheat such as emmer wheat and the wild goat-grass Aegilops tauschii. 

Genetic evidence shows that spelt wheat can also arise as the result of the hybridisation of bread wheat and emmer wheat, although only at some date following the initial Aegilops–tetraploid wheat hybridisation. The much later appearance of spelt in Europe might thus be the result of a later, second, hybridisation between emmer and bread wheat. Recent DNA evidence supports an independent origin for European spelt through this hybridisation. Whether spelt has two separate origins in Asia and Europe, or single origin in the Near East, is currently unresolved.

Terminological confusion with other hulled wheats

Especially in the context of descriptions of ancient cultures, there are many documents that use the English word spelt to refer to grains that, according to other sources, were not hexaploid T. spelta, but other species of hulled wheat such as tetraploid T. dicoccum (emmer wheat). This confusion may arise either from mistranslation of words found in other languages that can refer to hulled wheat in general without distinguishing between these species (such as Italian farro), or changing opinions about which actual species of wheat are described in texts written in ancient languages.

Likewise, the Ancient Roman grain denoted by the Latin word , although often translated as "spelt", was in fact emmer (T. dicoccum).

Similarly, references to the cultivation of spelt wheat in Biblical times (see matzo), in ancient Egypt and Mesopotamia are incorrect and result from confusion with emmer wheat.

History
The earliest archaeological evidence of spelt is from the fifth millennium BC in Transcaucasia, north-east of the Black Sea, though the most abundant and best-documented archaeological evidence of spelt is in Europe. Remains of spelt have been found in some later Neolithic sites (2500–1700 BC) in Central Europe. During the Bronze Age, spelt spread widely in central Europe. In the Iron Age (750–15 BC), spelt became a principal wheat species in southern Germany and Switzerland, and by 500 BC, it was in common use in southern Britain.

There is evidence that spelt cultivation increased in Iron Age Britain as damp regions of the country with heavy soils tolerated by spelt were being settled.

In the Middle Ages, spelt was cultivated in parts of Switzerland, Tyrol, Germany, northern France and the southern Low Countries. Spelt became a major crop in Europe in the 9th century AD, possibly because it is husked, unlike other grains, and therefore more adaptable to cold climates and is more suitable for storage.

Spelt was introduced to the United States in the 1890s. In the 20th century, spelt was replaced by bread wheat in almost all areas where it was still grown. The organic farming movement revived its popularity somewhat toward the end of the century, as spelt requires less fertilizer. Since the beginning of the 21st century, spelt has become a common wheat substitute for making artisanal loaves of bread, pasta, and flakes. By 2014, the grain was popular in the UK with the crop being grown there as well as in Kazakhstan and Ukraine, with shortages reported.

Nutrition

A  reference serving of uncooked spelt provides  of food energy and is a rich source (20% or more of the Daily Value) of protein, dietary fiber, several B vitamins, and numerous dietary minerals (table). Highest nutrient contents include manganese (143% DV), phosphorus (57% DV), and niacin (46% DV). Spelt contains about 70% total carbohydrates, including 11% as dietary fibre, and is low in fat (table).

Spelt contains gluten, and is therefore suitable for baking, but this component makes it unsuitable for people with gluten-related disorders, such as celiac disease, non-celiac gluten sensitivity, and wheat allergy. In comparison to hard red winter wheat, spelt has a more soluble protein matrix characterized by a higher gliadin:glutenin ratio.

Products

In Germany and Austria, spelt loaves and rolls (Dinkelbrot) are widely available in bakeries, as is spelt flour in supermarkets. The unripe spelt grains are dried and eaten as Grünkern ("green grain").
In Poland, spelt breads and flour are commonly available as health foods and easy to find in bakeries.

Dutch jenever makers distill with spelt. Beer brewed from spelt is sometimes seen in Bavaria and Belgium, and spelt is distilled to make vodka in Poland.

See also
 Khorasan wheat
 Farro
 Sorghum bicolor

References

External links

Plants described in 1753
Wheat
Wheat cultivars